Tom Sawyer is a 2000 animated musical comedy film directed by Paul Sabella and Phil Mendez. Released direct-to-video on April 4, 2000, the film was produced by MGM Animation. It is the only MGM Animation production not to available exclusively through Warner Home Video worldwide. This is also the final MGM Animation film before shutdown in 2002. It is an adaptation of Mark Twain's 1876 novel The Adventures of Tom Sawyer, with a cast of anthropomorphic animals instead of humans. Most of the characters' voices are generally performed by country music singers.

Plot 
Tom Sawyer and his half-brother Sid are on their way to school when they see Huckleberry Finn fishing. Tom skips school to join Huck, but changes his mind after he sees Becky Thatcher. He tries to sneak into class, but Sid snitches on him to the teacher, Mr. Dobbins. Tom is made to sit with the girls, which he actually likes since he's able to sit next to Becky. He is also sat beside Amy Lawrence, a friend to whom he became "engaged". She still has romantic feelings for him, but he is too transfixed by Becky to notice. Tom's pet frog Rebel then disrupts the class, meaning they are given early dismissals.

On the way home from school, during the musical number "Hook, Line and Sinker", Tom tries multiple times to steal a kiss from Becky, but is thwarted each time by her father, Judge Thatcher. The next day, Tom is about to go fishing with his friends. However, he was forced to paint the house by Aunt Polly as punishment for what happened at school. Tom, however, gets his friends to paint the house for him instead. While everyone is still painting, Becky stops by and Tom offers her to paint along with everyone else, but under one condition; she needs to kiss him. As Tom prepares for the kiss, he gets kissed by Rebel as a prank, making everyone laugh at him.

That night, when Tom and Huck go treasure hunting, they find Injurin' Joe and his sidekick Mutt Potter uncovering a chest of gold. Deputy Bean, who is visiting his wife's grave, discovers Joe and Mutt. As the boys watch from behind a tombstone, Joe brutally murders Bean who tried to hit him with a shovel, frames Mutt and captures Rebel. Tom knows that Joe can track him down through Rebel, so he and Huck make a pact never to tell anyone what they have seen.

The next day, at school Becky accidentally spills ink on test results.  Amy is so happy because she wants to cheat Becky, but Tom takes the blame, for which he receives a brutal thrashing with a ruler by Mr. Dobbins. After school, Tom becomes "engaged" to Becky, before a musical number by Becky and Amy, "One Dream", where the two individually express their shared love for Tom. He then admits he did the same with Amy, causing Becky to call off the engagement and then walks away. Tom and Huck visit Mutt, who is on death row. They try to get him to remember Injurin' Joe murdering Bean, but Mutt doesn't remember. Joe meanwhile finds Tom and Huck, but they escape on a raft. They celebrate their survival and friendship with a musical number, "Friends for Life".

When Tom and Huck swims back to town, they learn that the townspeople are mourning their deaths, believing the boys to have drowned. They disrupt the service, showing up at their own funeral, and are welcomed back. Amy, wanting to make Becky more upset at Tom, kisses Tom in front of Becky making her believe that Tom has chosen Amy over her and leaves before Tom can get a chance to explain, leaving him heartbroken. Judge Thatcher sentences Mutt to be hanged, but Huck and Tom testify against Joe at the last minute. Joe goes after Tom and Huck but fails and is pulled away by a river. Mutt was finally freed and his criminal charges were dropped, and the boys are hailed as heroes.

During the celebration, after making up with Tom, Becky talks Tom into exploring a cave. Amy follows them. Tom and Becky go into a cave and Tom says to Becky that she is the prettiest girl who he ever seen. That made Amy very sad and she stopped to follow Tom and Becky. They get lost and Becky begins to lose hope to finding the exit. Tom sings a number, "Light at the End of the Tunnel" to try and reassure her that they will find a way out. Instead of finding an exit, they find treasure - and Joe. Meanwhile, the townspeople notice Tom and Becky missing and Amy, who saw Tom and Becky go into the cave, reveals where they are. The townspeople go to look for them in the cave. With Huck's help, Tom subdues Joe, causing a rockfall which kills Joe, and is reunited with the townspeople and Aunt Polly. In the end Amy becomes Huck's girlfriend (after being impressed with how he assisted Tom against Joe) and Becky finally becomes Tom's girlfriend. Amy is no longer jealous of Becky. The next day, Sid again tries to snitch on Tom, but it backfires, as Aunt Polly makes Sid paint the house instead of Tom. The movie ends with Tom, Becky, Huck and Amy having a picnic, during which Tom shows the others a gold coin and tells them about another treasure hunt.

Cast 
 Rhett Akins as Tom Sawyer
 Mark Wills as Huckleberry Finn
 Hynden Walch as Becky Thatcher
 Lee Ann Womack as Becky Thatcher's singing voice
 Clea Lewis as Amy Lawrence
 Alecia Elliott as Amy Lawrence's singing voice
 Betty White as Aunt Polly
 Dean Haglund as Sid
 Richard Kind as Mr. Dobbins
 Hank Williams Jr. and Kevin Michael Richardson as Injurin' Joe
 Don Knotts as Mutt Potter
 Waylon Jennings as Judge Thatcher
 Dee Bradley Baker as Rebel the Frog
 Pat Corley as Sheriff McGee
 Marty Stuart as Reverend
 Thom Adcox as Deputy Bean
 Sheryl Bernstein
 Jennifer Hale
 David Kaufman

Character comparisons to original

Soundtrack 
 "Leave Your Love Light On" - Marty Stuart
 "Can't Keep a Country Boy Down" - Charlie Daniels
 "Hook, Line, and Sinker" - Mark Nesler
 "Houseboat Painting Song"
 "One Dream" - Lee Ann Womack/Alecia Elliott
 "Friends for Life" - Rhett Akins/Mark Wills
 "Light at the End of the Tunnel"/Reprise - Bryan White/Rebecca Lynn Howard/Rhett Akins/Lee Ann Womack
 "Never, Ever, and Forever" - Lee Ann Womack/Mark Wills
 "Injurin' Joe" - Ray Stevens

Production 
Tom Sawyer was announced to be in development since March 1998. In June 1998, MGM Animation made a deal with Stone Canyon Investments to fund three animated films over the course of four years, starting with Tom Sawyer.

The film was produced by MGM Animation, who were also responsible for All Dogs Go to Heaven 2, Babes in Toyland, and An All Dogs Christmas Carol. While the pre-production and post-production processes are based in the United States, it was animated by Wang Film Productions in Taipei, Taiwan. The film was not given a theatrical release, but was a direct-to-video release, then was actually meant to be released in theaters.

Betty White admitted to enjoying playing a character who was both "barrel-chested" and an animal character, explaining that "I'm closer to animals than I am to anything else," and also liked playing a "barrel-chested" woman. When asked how she got cast in a film mostly starring country stars, she answered, "I have no idea where I came into the act."

Release 
Tom Sawyer premiered on The Nashville Network on March 27, 2000 and repeated on the channel on April 1. TNN had planned a different program to air the same time and day as Tom Sawyer's repeat airing, that being the live presentation of that year's annual NASCAR Albertsons 300 race; however, due to rainy weather causing a delay, the sports division of TNN owner CBS chose to not have the channel air the event. Thus, Tom Sawyer was aired instead. MGM released Tom Sawyer on DVD and VHS on April 4, its soundtrack issued by MCA Records the same day. The DVD comes with a featurette about the production of the film. MGM later re-released the DVD in the United States on July 30, 2002, the United Kingdom on March 14, 2005, and issued a three-film DVD set on March 5, 2007 that included Tom Sawyer, The Secret of NIMH (1982), and its sequel.

Critical reception 
Harlene Ellin of The Chicago Tribune gave a negative review, saying that it "stray[ed] too far from Twain." An uncredited review in the Wichita Eagle was also unfavorable, calling it a "shallow" interpretation of Twain's work.

The New York Daily News strongly praised Tom Sawyer for its "fairly cute" animal characters; "crisp and colorful" animation; voice acting, particularly from Don Knotts; and the musical numbers. However, he found the portrayals of Tom and Becky a "little bland" and the song "Friends for Life" "incongruous, as though it had been tacked on for length." AllMovie also highlighted the animation, while The Star-Ledger spotlight its "pronounced country flavor" songs as well as "attractive extras."

Variety, in addition to the "energetic numbers," highlighted the film's dark content for a children's product, such as the murder sequence and the stakes of a dog character possibly being executed; but dismissed the visual gags and its more sentimental musical numbers as uninventive.

While both AllMovie and Bruce Westbrook of The Houston Chronicle as a good introduction of the source material for children, Westbrook's review wasn't without criticism. While applauding the "school antics" and orchestral score, he called the animation "weak" even for direct-to-video standards, suggested even children would be turned off by the sugarcoating of the material, mocked Atkins' performance as a "witlessly cheerful Gomer Pyle style," and panned the songs' "banal" qualities and "hard-core twang."

References

External links 
 
 

2000 direct-to-video films
2000 animated films
2000 films
American children's animated adventure films
American children's animated comedy films
American children's animated musical films
Direct-to-video animated films
Films based on The Adventures of Tom Sawyer
Metro-Goldwyn-Mayer animated films
Metro-Goldwyn-Mayer direct-to-video films
Films scored by Mark Watters
2000s American animated films
Films based on American novels
Films with screenplays by Jymn Magon
2000s children's animated films
Metro-Goldwyn-Mayer Animation films
Films directed by Paul Sabella
2000s English-language films